Harvey Golub (born April 16, 1939) is an American businessman.

Biography
Born to a Jewish family, Golub attended Cornell University and received a Bachelor of Science from the New York University.

He worked as a senior partner with McKinsey & Company. In 1983, American Express hired him to investigate a possible acquisition – Investors Diversified Services. After acquiring IDS, American Express hired Golub to run the company, which became American Express' second most profitable sector. In 1990 he was made vice chairman of American Express while remaining president and chief executive officer of IDS. In 1991, he was named president of American Express. From 1993 to 2001, he was chief executive officer of American Express. He served as Chairman of the board at the Campbell Soup Company from November 2004 to July 2009. He served as chairman of the American International Group (AIG). His resignation as AIG chairman was announced on July 16, 2010.  He sits on the boards of directors of Marblegate Asset Management, the Campbell Soup Company,  and Ripplewood Holdings.

In 2016, Golub was appointed to chair boutique energy company.

He currently serves as the chairman of Miller Buckfire and as Director at Hess Corporation.

He sits on the board of trustees of the American Enterprise Institute, the Manhattan Institute for Policy Research, and the Lincoln Center for the Performing Arts.

In addition, he also serves on Jupiter Medical Center‘s board of trustees and is chairman of the Maltz Jupiter Theatre endowment board. He is a director emeritus of New York-Presbyterian Hospital and the Lincoln Center for the Performing Arts and a member of its investment committee.

Golub was named the interim non-executive chairman of the board of Dynasty financial partners in April 2020.

Personal life 
Harvey Golub is married to Roberta Golub. Golub is the father of three adult children by a previous marriage.

References

Living people
Cornell University alumni
New York University Stern School of Business alumni
American chief executives of financial services companies
American Express people
20th-century American Jews
Lehman Brothers
McKinsey & Company people
1939 births
21st-century American Jews
Ameriprise Financial people